The Enigma is an 8×8 wheeled amphibious armored personnel carrier developed by Emirates Defense Technology in UAE. It was introduced at IDEX 2015.

Design
The driver sits at the front-left side with the engine to his right. The turret is in the middle, and the passenger compartment, which accommodates 8 soldiers with their gear, is located at the rear. Soldiers enter and leave the vehicle via the powered rear door and roof hatches. Air-conditioning has been added for the comfort of crew and passengers.

Weapons
The Enigma is fitted with the turret of a Russian BMP-3 with 100 mm cannon, coaxial 30 mm machine gun, coaxial 7.62-mm machine gun, and smoke grenade launchers. The 100 mm cannon auto-loader is able to fire 10 rounds per minute, firing HE-FRAG projectiles beside ordinary and laser-guided anti-tank ammunition. It can launch laser-guided projectiles in the same manner as ordinary rounds.

The 30 mm auto-cannon is used against ground and low flying air targets with a range of 2 km against ground targets and 4 km against helicopters. Other proposed versions include a fire support vehicle (FSV) with a 155 mm howitzer, and an air defense vehicle fitted with automatic cannons.

Protection
Enigma's front arc is able to withstand 30 mm armor-piercing rounds while other parts of the vehicle resist against 14.5 mm armor-piercing rounds. Additionally applied armor can be fitted according to customer requirements. The vehicle has a v-shaped hull to resist mines and IED explosions. The tires feature a 'run-flat' capability. Engima has been provided with a battlefield management system (BMS), active defense suit, periscopes, local cameras and an NBC protection kit.

Engine
The Enigma is powered by a Caterpillar turbocharged diesel engine developing .  On paved streets, the Enigma can reach .  The vehicle has an all-wheel steering capability.  On water, the Enigma uses two propellers fixed to the rear of the hull.

Variants
 Enigma AMFV - Base series designation.
 Enigma IFV - Infantry fighting vehicle.
 Enigma air defense variant.
 Enigma CCV - command & control vehicle.
 Enigma - Fire support vehicle equipped with BAE systems M777 light weight howitzer (155mm caliber).

References

External links
 Army Technology
 Military-Today.com
 Military Factory

Amphibious armoured personnel carriers
Armoured personnel carriers of the United Arab Emirates
Wheeled armoured personnel carriers
Eight-wheeled vehicles
Wheeled amphibious armoured fighting vehicles